Bago Region Government is the cabinet of Bago Region, Myanmar. The cabinet is led by chief minister, Myo Swe Win.

Cabinet (February 2021–present)

References 

State and region governments of Myanmar
Bago Region